The New Zealand women's national cricket team toured the West Indies in October 2013. They played the West Indies in three One Day Internationals, losing the series 2–1. They then played in the 2013–14 West Indies Women T20 Tri-Series, against England and the West Indies, which was won by the West Indies.

WODI Series

Squads

1st ODI

2nd ODI

3rd ODI

See also
 2013–14 West Indies Women T20 Tri-Series

References

External links
New Zealand Women tour of West Indies 2013/14 from Cricinfo

International cricket competitions in 2013
2013 in women's cricket
Women's international cricket tours of the West Indies
New Zealand women's national cricket team tours